Athletics competitions at the 1994 Central American Games were held at the Estadio Flor Blanca in San Salvador, El Salvador, in November – December 1, 1994.

A total of 45 events were contested, 24 by men and 21 by women.

Medal summary

Gold medal winners and their results were published.  A complete list of medal winners can be found on the MásGoles webpage
(click on "JUEGOS CENTROAMERICANOS" in the low right corner).  Gold medalists were also published in other sources.

Men

Women

Notes
†: One source lists María Fleischmann from Guatemala as
gold medal winner in both long jump and triple jump.

‡: One source lists Magdalena Molina from
Costa Rica as gold medal winner in Heptathlon.

*: Original model javelin.

**: One source lists the relay teams of Costa Rica as
gold medal winners for both 4 × 100 m relay and 4 × 400 m relay.

Medal table (unofficial)

References

Athletics at the Central American Games
International athletics competitions hosted by El Salvador
Central American Games
1994 in Salvadoran sport